The Eastern Zone was one of the three regional zones of the 1975 Davis Cup.

10 teams entered the Eastern Zone: 4 teams entered the competition in the Qualifying Rounds, with the winners of the 2 head-to-head ties progressing to the preliminary rounds, where they were joined by an additional 4 teams. From the 6 competing teams in the preliminary rounds, 3 head-to-head ties determined the winning teams who progressed to the main draw, joining the remaining 3 teams. Following a knockout competition, the winner of the main draw went on to compete in the Inter-Zonal Zone against the winners of the Americas Zone and Europe Zone.

Australia defeated New Zealand in the final and progressed to the Inter-Zonal Zone.

Draw

Pre-qualifying round
Malaysia vs. South Vietnam

Philippines vs. Pakistan

Preliminary round
South Vietnam vs. South Korea

Indonesia vs. Japan

Sri Lanka vs. Philippines

Quarterfinals
New Zealand vs. South Vietnam

Japan vs. Philippines

Semifinals
India vs. New Zealand

Australia vs. Japan

Final
New Zealand vs. Australia

References

External links
Davis Cup official website

Davis Cup Asia/Oceania Zone
Eastern Zone
Davis Cup
Davis Cup
Davis Cup
Davis Cup